Slave Girls of Sheba is a 1963 adventure film directed by Giacomo Gentilomo and Guido Zurli.

Cast 

 José Suárez: Omar
 Linda Cristal: Olivia 
 Cristina Gaioni: Ursula 
 Mimmo Palmara: Hibrahim 
 Hélène Chanel: Harem Girl 
 Vittorio Sanipoli: Sheik Selim 
 José Jaspe: Friar 
 Walter Barnes

Release
Slave Girls of Sheba was released in Italy on May 24, 1963.

See also
 List of Italian films of 1963

References

Sources

External links

Slave Girls of Sheba at Variety Distribution

1963 films
1963 adventure films
Italian adventure films
Films directed by Giacomo Gentilomo
Films with screenplays by Sergio Leone
Yugoslav adventure films
1960s Italian films